Thavưng or Aheu is a language spoken by the Phon Sung people in Laos and Thailand. There are thought to be some 1,770 speakers in Laos, largely concentrated in Khamkeut District.  A further 750 speakers live in 3 villages of Song Dao District, Sakon Nakhon Province, Thailand, namely Ban Nong Waeng (in Pathum Wapi Subdistrict), Ban Nong Charoen, and Ban Nong Muang.

Thavung makes a four-way distinction between clear and breathy phonation combined with glottalized final consonants. This is very similar to the situation in the Pearic languages in which, however, the glottalization is in the vowel.

Phonology

Consonants

Vowels 

The vowels can also be long. In Thavung there are 3 Diphthongs: ia ɨa ua.

Further reading
Premsrirat, Suwilai (1996). Phonological characteristics of So (Thavung), a Vietic language of Thailand.

References

Languages of Laos
Vietic languages
Languages of Thailand